Johan Brunström and Frederik Nielsen were the defending champions, but decided not to participate.
Stefano Ianni and Florin Mergea won the title by defeating Konstantin Kravchuk and Nikolaus Moser 6–2, 6–3 in the final.

Seeds

Draw

Draw

References
 Main draw

Doubles
2012